The 1924–25 Cincinnati Bearcats men's basketball team represented the University of Cincinnati during the 1924–25 NCAA men's basketball season. The head coach was Boyd Chambers, coaching his seventh season with the Bearcats. The team finished with an overall record of 5–14.

Schedule

|-

References

Cincinnati Bearcats men's basketball seasons
Cincinnati Bearcats men's basketball team
Cincinnati Bearcats men's basketball team
Cincinnati Bearcats men's basketball team